Beishicao Town is a town located within Shunyi District, Beijing. It borders Qiaozi Town in its north, Miaocheng Town in its east, Zhaoquanying Town in its south, and Xingshou Town in its west. In 2020, the census counted 15,109 residents for this town.

The name Beishicao was taken from its location north of a stone ditch during the Yuan dynasty.

History

Administrative divisions 
As of 2021, the following 16 villages constituted Beishicao Town:

See also 

 List of township-level divisions of Beijing

References 

Towns in Beijing
Shunyi District